The Coalition, also but rarely known as Conservative Coalition, was a Chilean coalition formed in 1891 after the 1891 Chilean Civil War and it was the main opposer of the Liberal Alliance. The Coalition was formed by the Conservative Party, democrats, nationals and different liberal organizations. Along with the Liberal Alliance, it was one of the two parties of the bipartisan system of that time. Between 1920 and 1925 it took as name National Union and during that period it was formed by the Conservative Party, the unionist liberals, the nationals and the liberal democrats.

Presidential candidacies supported by the Coalition
1891 - Jorge Montt Álvarez (chosen as president thanks to an agreement between all the political parties of his candidacy)
1896 – Federico Errázuriz Echaurren (chosen as president)
1901 – Pedro Montt Montt (not chosen)
1906 – Fernando Lazcano (not chosen)
1910 – Ramón Barros Luco (chosen as president thanks to an agreement between all the political parties of his candidacy)
1915 – Juan Luis Sanfuentes Andonaegui (chosen as president)
1920 – Luis Barros Borgoño (not chosen)

Electoral Results (1891-1924)
Number of parliament members and senators

Sources
The original version of this article draws heavily on the corresponding article in the Spanish-language Wikipedia, which was accessed in the version of 8 June 2007.

See also
Conservative Party (Chile)

Political parties established in 1891
Defunct political party alliances in Chile
1891 establishments in Chile